Vice Admiral Sir Hugh Richard Benest Janvrin  (2 May 1915 – 15 January 1993) was a Royal Navy officer who served as Deputy Chief of the Naval Staff (1966–68) and Flag Officer Naval Air Command (1968–70).

Naval career
Educated at the Royal Naval College, Dartmouth, Janvrin joined the Royal Navy in 1929 and specialised in aerial observation. He was confirmed as a sub-lieutenant (from acting sub-lieutenant) on 16 January 1936, and promoted to lieutenant on 1 October 1937.

Janvrin served in the Second World War and acted as an observer at the Battle of Taranto in November 1940, serving on HMS Illustrious. For his service, he was awarded the Distinguished Service Cross on 20 May 1941. An acting lieutenant commander at war's end, he was promoted to substantive lieutenant commander on 1 October 1945.

Promoted to commander on 31 December 1948, Janvrin was given command of the destroyer  in 1951. He was appointed Director of Tactical and Weapons Policy Division of the Admiralty Naval Staff from 1962 to 1963. He was promoted to rear admiral on 7 January 1964, appointed Flag Officer, Aircraft Carriers the same year and appointed a Companion of the Order of the Bath in the 1965 Birthday Honours.

Janvrin became Deputy Chief of the Naval Staff in 1966 and was promoted to vice admiral on 27 November 1967. He was appointed Flag Officer Naval Air Command in 1968, and a Knight Commander of the Order of the Bath in the 1969 New Year Honours. He was placed on the retired list on 15 January 1971.

Family and later life
In 1938 Janvrin married Nancy Edyth Fielding; they had two sons (Simon and Robin).

Janvrin lived at Allen's Close in Stroud in Gloucestershire. He died on 15 January 1993, aged 77.

References

1915 births
1993 deaths
Fleet Air Arm personnel of World War II
Knights Commander of the Order of the Bath
Knights of the Order of Merit of the Italian Republic
Recipients of the Distinguished Service Cross (United Kingdom)
Royal Navy vice admirals
Royal Navy officers of World War II